MSOV (Modular Stand-Off Vehicle) is a modular stand-off glide bomb with a range of up to 100km (55nm), manufactured by Israel Military Industries (IMI). Length is 3.97m long and has a wingspan of 2.7m.The weight of the vehicle, including the a 675kg modular unitary warhead payload, is 1,050kg. Guidance is via GPS. The wings unfold after the weapon is released from the aircraft. Two MSOVs can be carried by an F-16I.

See also
 MLGB
 Armement Air-Sol Modulaire (AASM)
 FT PGB
 LS PGB
 LT PGB
 Joint Direct Attack Munition (JDAM)
 HGK
 Denel Dynamics Umbani
 KGGB
 JSOW

References

Cruise missiles of Israel
Guided missiles of Israel
Guided bombs of Israel
Aerial bombs of Israel